SS Aorangi was a passenger and refrigerated cargo ship built by John Elder & Co. of Govan, Glasgow for the New Zealand Shipping Company and launched in 1883. She was chartered by the Royal Australian Navy (RAN) between April 1914 until 1915. In 1915, she was sunk as a blockship at Scapa Flow. In 1920, she was raised but re-sank in Kirk Bay.

Career
John Elder & Co of Govan built Aorangi as a passenger and refrigerated cargo ship for the New Zealand Shipping Company. Launched in 1883, she saw service on the passenger route between England and New Zealand, with accommodations for 80 first-class, 80 second-class, and 250 third-class passengers. She was then chartered in 1894 to Huddart Parker, underwent a major refit from 1896 to 1897, that made her funnel  taller and changed her accommodations to 100 first-class and 50 second-class berths.

The ship saw service after her 1897 refit on the route between Australia, New Zealand and San Francisco, which included cargo and passenger service between Honolulu and Vancouver. Aorangi in this time carried some of the 1878 to 1911 wave of Portuguese immigration to Hawaii, when she arrived on 16 February 1901 in Honolulu Harbor from Vancouver with a contingent of 23 Portuguese immigrants, who had been recruited from the Eastern United States to work as contract laborers on the Hawaiian sugarcane plantations. The Aorangi continued to provide service between Australia and the United States until 1914 when she was laid up at Sydney.

In April 1914 the Royal Australian Navy (RAN) chartered Aorangi and used her as a supply ship. However, she was not commissioned into the RAN, but was manned by her civilian crew. She was armed with a QF 12 pounder 12 cwt naval gun, and took part in operations against the German colonies in the Pacific with the Australian Naval and Military Expeditionary Force and Australian Fleet. She was returned in May 1915 to her owners and subsequently sold to the Admiralty.

Fate
She was scuttled on 10 August 1915 in Holm Sound, Scapa Flow as a blockship. In 1920 she was salvaged/refloated. She broke loose from her tow and sank in Kirk Bay.

Notes

References
 

1883 ships

Steamships of New Zealand
Ships of the New Zealand Shipping Company
Passenger ships of New Zealand
Portuguese immigration to Hawaii
Ships built on the River Clyde
Cargo ships of the Royal Australian Navy